The Golders Green War Memorial is a war memorial in Golders Green, North London, United Kingdom. The memorial, which takes the form of a clock tower, was dedicated on 21 April 1923. It commemorates both victims of World War I and World War II.

References

External links
 

Clock towers in the United Kingdom
Golders Green
Military memorials in London
World War I memorials in England
World War II memorials in England
1923 establishments in England
Grade II listed buildings in the London Borough of Barnet
Towers completed in  1923